The music of Brazil encompasses various regional musical styles influenced by European, American, African and Amerindian forms. Brazilian music developed some unique and original styles such as forró, repente, coco de roda, axé, sertanejo, samba, bossa nova, MPB, música nativista, pagode, tropicália, choro, maracatu, embolada (coco de repente), frevo, brega, modinha and Brazilian versions of foreign musical styles, such as rock, pop music, soul, hip-hop, disco music, country music, ambient, industrial and psychedelic music, rap, classical music, fado, and gospel.

Samba has become the most known form of Brazilian music worldwide, especially because of the country's carnival, although bossa nova, which had Antônio Carlos Jobim as one of its most acclaimed composers and performers, have received much attention abroad since the 1950s, when the song "Desafinado", interpreted by João Gilberto, was first released.

The first four winners of the Shell Brazilian Music prize have each left a legacy on Brazilian music and are among the representatives of Brazilian popular music: Pixinguinha (choro), Antônio Carlos Jobim (bossa nova), Dorival Caymmi (samba and samba-canção).

Instrumental music is also largely practiced in Brazil, with styles ranging from classical to popular and jazz influenced forms. Among the later, Naná Vasconcelos, Pixinguinha, Hermeto Pascoal and Egberto Gismonti are significant figures. Notable classical composers include Heitor Villa-Lobos, Carlos Gomes and Cláudio Santoro. The country also has a growing community of modern/experimental composition, including electroacoustic music.

History

Art music

Origins 
Little is known of the music of Brazil before the area's first encounter with Portuguese explorers on 22 April 1500. During the colonial period, documents detail the musical activities of the major Roman Catholic cathedrals and the parlors of the upper classes, but data about musical life outside these domains are sparse. Some information is available in writings left by such travellers as Jean de Léry, who lived in Brazil from 1557 to 1558 and produced the first known transcriptions of native American music: two chants of the Tupinambá, near Rio de Janeiro.

Further registration of musical activity in Brazil came from the activities of two Jesuit priests in 1549. Ten years later, they had already founded settlements for indigenous people (the Reduções), with a musical-educational structure.

One century later, the Reduções of the southern Brazil, which were founded by Spaniard Jesuits, had a strong cultural development, where some music schools were founded. Some of the reports of that time show the fascination of the indigenous people for European music. The indigenous people also took part in the music, with both the construction of musical instruments and practice of vocal and instrumental performance.

The 18th-century school 

In the 18th century, there was intense musical activity in all the more developed regions of Brazil, with their moderately stable institutional and educational structures. The previously few private orchestras became more common and the churches presented a great variety of music.

In the first half of this century, the most outstanding works were composed by Luís Álvares Pinto, Caetano de Mello de Jesus and Antônio José da Silva ("the Jew"), who became successful in Lisbon writing librettos for comedies, which were performed also in Brazil with music by António Teixeira.

In the second part of the 18th century, there was a great flourishing in Minas Gerais, mostly in the regions of Vila Rica (currently Ouro Preto), Mariana and Arraial do Tejuco (currently Diamantina), where the mining of gold and diamonds for the Portuguese metropolis attracted a sizable population. At this time, the first outstanding Brazilian composers were revealed, most of them mulattoes. The musical pieces were mostly sacred music. Some of the noteworthy composers of this period were Lobo de Mesquita, Manoel Dias de Oliveira, Francisco Gomes da Rocha, Marcos Coelho Neto and Marcos Coelho Neto Filho. All of them were very active, but in many cases few pieces have survived until the present day. Some of the most famous pieces of this period are the Magnificat by Manoel Dias de Oliveira and the Our Lady's Antiphon by Lobo de Mesquita. In the city of Arraial do Tejuco, nowadays Diamantina, there were ten conductors in activity. In Ouro Preto about 250 musicians were active, and in all of the territory of Minas Gerais almost a thousand musicians were active.

With the impoverishment of the mines at the end of the century, the focus of the musical activity changed to other centers, specially Rio de Janeiro and São Paulo, where André da Silva Gomes, a composer of Portuguese origin, released a great number of works and dynamized the musical life of the city.

Also, the oldest Orchestra of all Americas is situated in São João del-Rei, Minas Gerais, called Lira Sanjoanense, conducted, today, by Modesto Flávio Fonseca.

The Classical period 

A crucial factor for the changes in the musical life was the arrival of the Portuguese Royal family to Rio de Janeiro in 1808. Until then, Rio de Janeiro was musically similar to other cultural centers of Brazil but was even less important than Minas Gerais. The presence of the Portuguese Royal family, in exile, radically changed this situation, as the Capela Real of Rio de Janeiro was established.

The king John VI of Portugal brought with him to Brazil the great musical library from the House of Bragança, one of the best of Europe at that time, and ordered the arrival of musicians from Lisbon and the castrati from Italy, re-ordering the Royal Chapel. Later, John VI ordered the construction of a sumptuous theater, called the Royal Theater of São João. The secular music had the presence of Marcos Portugal, who was designated as the official composer of the household, and of Sigismund von Neukomm, who contributed with his own work and brought the works of the Austrian composers Wolfgang Amadeus Mozart and Joseph Haydn. The works of these composers strongly influenced the Brazilian music of this time.

José Maurício Nunes Garcia, the first of the great Brazilian composers, emerged at this time. With a large culture for his origin – he was poor and mulatto – he was one of the founders of the Irmandade de Santa Cecília, in Rio de Janeiro, teacher and mestre de capela of the Royal Chapel during the presence of John VI in Brazil. Nunes Garcia was the most prolific Brazilian composer of this time. He also composed the first opera written in Brazil, Le Due Gemelle (The Two Twins), with text in Italian, but the music is now lost.

Other important composers of this period are Gabriel Fernandes da Trindade, who composed the only Brazilian chamber music from the 19th century which has survived to the present times, and João de Deus de Castro Lobo, who lived in the cities of Mariana and Ouro Preto, which were decadent at this time.

This period, however, was brief. In 1821, John VI went back to Lisbon, taking with him the household, and the cultural life in Rio de Janeiro became empty. And, despite the love of Peter I of Brazil for the music – he was also author of some musical pieces like the Brazilian Independence Anthem – the difficult financial situation didn't allow many luxuries. The conflagration of the Royal Theater in 1824 was another symbol of decadence, which reached the most critical point when Peter I renounced the throne, going back to Portugal.

The Romantic period 

The only composer who had a relevant work in this period was Francisco Manuel da Silva, disciple of Nunes Garcia, who succeeded him as kapellmeister. In spite of his few resources, he founded the Musical Conservatory of Rio de Janeiro. He was the author of the Brazilian National Anthem's melody. His work reflected the musical transition for the Romanticism, when the interest of the national composers was focused in the opera. The most outstanding Brazilian composer of this period was Antônio Carlos Gomes, who composed Italian-styled operas with national themes, such as Il Guarany (based on José de Alencar's novel O Guarani) and Lo Schiavo. These operas were very successful in European theaters, like the Teatro alla Scala, in Milan. Other important composer of this time is Elias Álvares Lobo, who wrote the opera A Noite de São João, the first Brazilian opera with text in Portuguese.

The opera in Brazil was very popular until the middle of the 20th century, and many opera houses were built at this time, like Teatro Amazonas in Manaus, Municipal Theater of Rio de Janeiro, Municipal Theater of São Paulo, and many others.

At the end of the 19th century, the greatest composers for the symphonic music were revealed. One of the most outstanding name of this period was Leopoldo Miguez, who followed the Wagnerian style and Henrique Oswald, who incorporated elements of the French Impressionism.

Nationalism 

In the beginning of the 20th century, there was a movement for creating an authentically Brazilian music, with less influences of the European culture. In this sense, the folklore was the major font of inspiration for the composers. Some composers like Brasílio Itiberê da Cunha, Luciano Gallet and Alexandre Levy, despite having a European formation, included some typically Brazilian elements in their works. This trend reached the highest point with Alberto Nepomuceno, who used largely the rhythms and melodies from the Brazilian folklore. There were local cultural movements to consolidate regional identities through music as for example, José Brazilício de Souza, who wrote the state anthem of Santa Catarina and his son Álvaro Sousa, who was a noticeable musician, music educator, and composer there.

An important event, later, was the Modern Art Week, in 1922, which had a large impact on concepts of national art. In this event the composer Heitor Villa-Lobos, regarded as the most outstanding name of the Brazilian nationalism, was revealed.

Villa-Lobos did researches about the musical folklore of Brazil, and mixed elements both from classical and popular music. He explored many musical genres such as concertos, symphonies, modinhas, Fados, and other symphonic, vocal and chamber music. Some of his masterworks are the ballet Uirapuru and the two series of Chôros and Bachianas Brasileiras.

Other composers of Brazilian national music of this era include Oscar Lorenzo Fernández, Radamés Gnattali, Camargo Guarnieri, Osvaldo Lacerda, Francisco Mignone, and Ernesto Nazareth.

The avant-garde movement 

As a reaction against the nationalist school, who was identified as "servile" to the centralizing politics of Getúlio Vargas, in 1939 the Movimento Música Viva (Living Music Movement) appeared, led by Hans Joachim Koellreutter and by Egídio de Castro e Silva, defending the adoption of an international style, derived from the dodecaphonism of Arnold Schoenberg. This group was integrated by composers like Cláudio Santoro, César Guerra-Peixe, Eunice Catunda and Edino Krieger. Koellreutter adopted revolutionary methodes, in respect to the individuality of each student and giving to the students the freedom of creativity before the knowledge of the traditional rules for composition. The movement edited a magazine and presented a series of radio programs showing their fundaments and works of contemporary music. Later, Guerra-Peixe and Santoro followed an independent way, centered in the regional music. Other composers, who used freely the previous styles were Marlos Nobre, Almeida Prado, and Armando Albuquerque, who created their own styles.

After 1960, the Brazilian avant-garde movement received a new wave, focusing on serial music, microtonal music, concrete music and electronic music, employing a completely new language. This movement was called Música Nova (New Music) and was led by Gilberto Mendes and Willy Corrêa de Oliveira. An important fact was the introduction of electronic music in Brazil, with the pioneering works of the carioca Jorge Antunes in 1961.

Brazilian Opera 
Carlos Gomes was the first composer on non-European origin to achieve wide recognition in the classical music environment of the Golden age of Opera in Italy. Bossa Nova was created as anti-opera in a time when opera seemed to represent the art-form of the elite. [5] In recent years the style has been revived with works by Jorge Antunes, Flo Menezes, and others.

Since 2014 the International Brazilian Opera (IBOC) has been producing new works, most notably by its artistic director and resident composer Joao MacDowell.

Contemporary 

Nowadays, Brazilian music follows the guidelines of both experimentalism and traditional music. Some of the contemporary Brazilian composers are Amaral Vieira, Sílvio Ferraz, Nestor de Hollanda Cavalcanti, Flo Menezes, Marcos Balter, Alexandre Lunsqui, Rodolfo Caesar, Felipe Lara, Edson Zampronha, Marcus Siqueira, Rodrigo Lima, Jorge Antunes, Roberto Victorio and João MacDowell. From the new generation of Brazilian composers, Caio Facó has achieved international recognition for his work.

Brazil has a large number of internationally recognized orchestras and performers, despite the relatively low support of the government. The most famous Brazilian orchestra is probably the São Paulo State Symphony Orchestra, currently under conductor Thierry Fischer. Other Brazilian orchestras worthy of note are the São Paulo University Symphony, the Orquestra Sinfônica Brasileira, Orquestra Filarmônica de Minas Gerais and the Petrobras Sinfônica, supported by the Brazilian state oil company Petrobras.

There are also regular operas scheduled every year in cities such as São Paulo and Rio de Janeiro. The state of São Paulo also hosts the Winter Festival in the city of Campos do Jordão.

Some of the most famous Brazilian conductors are Roberto Minczuk, John Neschling and Isaac Karabtchevsky. The instrumentalists include, among others: Roberto Szidon, Antonio Meneses, Cussy de Almeida, Gilberto Tinetti, Arnaldo Cohen, Nelson Freire, Eudóxia de Barros, Guiomar Novaes and Magda Tagliaferro. And some of the most famous Brazilian singers were, historically, Zola Amaro, Constantina Araújo and Bidu Sayão; living singers include Eliane Coelho, Kismara Pessatti, Maria Lúcia Godoy, Sebastião Teixeira, and others.

In the 1980s, a wave of Brazilian heavy metal bands gained public attention. The most commercially successful of these was Sepultura, founded in São Paulo in 1983, preceded by Dorsal Atlantica and followed by Sarcófago.

The intrusion of alien elements into Brazil's cultural system is not a destructive process. The return of a democratic government allowed for freedom of expression. The Brazilian music industry opened up to international styles and this has allowed for both foreign and local genres to co-exist and identify people. Each different style relates to the people socially, politically, and economically. "Brazil is a regionally divided country with a rich cultural and musical diversity among states. As such, musicians in the country choose to define their local heritage differently depending on where they come from." This shows how globalization has not robbed Brazil of its identity but instead given it the ability to represent its people both in Brazil and the rest of the world.

In recent years Brazilian artists have become more interested in Africa, the Caribbean and their own indigenous and folk music. While there are some artists who continue to perform rock and Western pop, there are now just as many contemporaries playing a fusion of African and European influences with those from across The Americas. Some artists have even become influenced by Asian music, noticing some parallels between music from the Northeast of Brazil and music from India.

Indigenous and folk music 

The native peoples of the Brazilian rainforest play instruments including whistles, flutes, horns, drums and rattles. Much of the area's folk music imitates the sounds of the Amazon Rainforest.  When the Portuguese arrived in Brazil, the first natives they met played an array of reed flutes and other wind and percussion instruments.

The Jesuit missionaries introduced songs which used the Tupi language with Christian lyrics, an attempt to convert the people to Christianity, and also introduced Gregorian chant and the flute, bow, and the clavichord.

Capoeira music 

The Afro-Brazilian sport of capoeira is never played without its own music, which is usually considered to be a call-and-response type of folk music. The main instruments of capoeira music include the berimbau, the atabaque and the pandeiro. Capoeira songs may be improvised on the spot, or they may be popular songs written by older, and ancient mestres (teachers), and often include accounts of the history of capoeira, or the doings of great mestres.

Maracatu 

This type of music is played primarily in the Recife and Olinda regions during Carnaval. It is an Afro-Brazilian tradition. The music serves as the backdrop for parade groups that evolved out of ceremonies conducted during colonial times in honour of the Kings of Congo, who were African slaves occupying symbolic leadership positions among the slave population. The music is played on large alfaia drums, large metal gonguê bells, snare drums and shakers. 

An important variant is found in and around Fortaleza, Ceará (called maracatu cearense), which is different from the Recife/Olinda tradition in many respects: triangles are used instead of gonguês, surdos or zabumbas instead of alfaias.  Also, important female characters are performed by cross-dressed male performers, and all African and Afrobrazilian personages are performed using blackface makeup.

Afoxé 

Afoxé is the name given to a group dedicated to playing ijexá, which is a kind of religious music, part of the Candomblé tradition.  In 1949, a group called Filhos de Gandhi began playing afoxé during carnaval parades in Salvador; their name translates as Sons of Gandhi, associating black Brazilian activism with Mahatma Gandhi's Indian independence movement. 

The Filhos de Gandhi's 1949 appearance was also revolutionary because, until then, the Carnaval parades in Salvador were meant only for light-skinned people.

Repente 
Northeastern Brazil is known for a distinctive form of literature called literatura de cordel, which are a type of ballads that include elements incorporated into music as "repentismo", an improvised lyrical contest on themes suggested by the audience.

Similar to Repentismo, appears among the Caipira culture a musical form derived from viola caipira, which is called cururu.

Popular music

Choro 

Choro (literally "cry" in Portuguese, but in context a more appropriate translation would be "lament"), traditionally called chorinho ("little cry" or "little lament"). Instrumental, its origins are in 19th century Rio de Janeiro. Originally choro was played by a trio of flute, guitar and cavaquinho (a small chordophone with four strings). The young pianist Ernesto Nazareth published his first choro (Não Caio Noutra) in 1878 at the age of 14. Nazareth's choros are often listed as polkas; he also composed waltzes, schottisches, milongas and Brazilian Tangos. (He resisted the popular term maxixe to represent Brazilian tango.) Chiquinha Gonzaga was another important composer of choros and started shortly after Nazareth. Chiquinha Gonzaga composed her first success, the polka-choro "Atraente", in 1877. In the beginning, the success of choro came from informal groups of friends which played in parties, pubs (botecos), streets, home balls (forrobodós), and also the musical scores published by print houses. By the 1910s, much of the Brazilian first phonograph records are choros. The mainstream success of this style of music (By the 1930s) came from the early days of radio, when bands performed live on the air. By the 1950s and 1960s it was replaced by samba and Bossa Nova and other styles of Brazilian popular music, but was still alive in amateur circles called "rodas de choro" (informal choro gatherings in residences and botecos). However, in the late 1970s there was a successful effort to revitalize the genre carried out by some famous artists: Pixinguinha, Waldir Azevedo and Jacob do Bandolim.

Samba 

In 1929, prompted by the opening of the first radio station in Rio de Janeiro, the so-called radio era began spreading songs – especially the novelty Samba in its current format – to larger masses. This period was dominated by few male interpreters – notably Almirante, Braguinha, Mário Reis, Sílvio Caldas, Francisco Alves and singer/composer Noel Rosa and even fewer chanteuses such as Aracy de Almeida and sisters Aurora Miranda and Carmen Miranda, who eventually came to Hollywood becoming a movie star.

Popular music included instruments like cuicas, tambourines, frying pans ('played' with a metal stick), flutes and guitars.  Noteworthy Samba composers at this early stage included said Noel Rosa plus Lamartine Babo and, around World War II time, Ary Barroso.

MPB (Popular Brazilian Music) 

MPB's early stage (from World War II to the mid-1960s) was populated by male singers such as Orlando Silva, Nelson Gonçalves, Jamelão, Agostinho dos Santos, Anísio Silva, Ataulfo Alves, Carlos Galhardo, Ciro Monteiro, Ismael Silva, João Dias, Jorge Goulart, Miltinho, Jorge Veiga and Francisco Egídio and female singers started to mushroom: Nora Ney, Dolores Duran, Ângela Maria, Emilinha Borba, Marlene, Dalva de Oliveira, Maysa Matarazzo, sisters Linda Batista and Dircinha Batista, among others.

MPB's second stage – after the split Bossa Nova (1959) / Jovem Guarda (1965) / Tropicalismo (both 1967) – refers to mainstream Brazilian pop music. Well-known MPB artists include, among many others, singers such as Elis Regina, Gal Costa, Nara Leão, Maria Bethânia, Mônica da Silva, Simone, Chico Buarque, Caetano Veloso, Roberto Carlos, Jorge Ben Jor, Milton Nascimento, Gilberto Gil, João Bosco, Ivan Lins, Djavan.

Bossa nova 

The first bossa nova records by João Gilberto, in the last years of the 1950s, quickly became huge hits in Brazil. Antonio Carlos Jobim and other composers helped further develop this fusion of jazz harmonies and a smoother, often slower, samba beat, which developed at the beach neighborhoods of Ipanema and, later, the Copacabana nightclubs. Bossa nova was introduced to the rest of the world by American jazz musicians in the early 1960s, and song "The Girl from Ipanema" remains probably the best known Brazilian musical export, eventually becoming a jazz standard.

Brazilian gospel 

Gospel music emerged in Brazil before the 1960s with hymnals that were brought and translated into Portuguese by American missionaries. From the late 1960s the first singers of Christian music groups emerged in Brazil, but the songs were not highly valued. Gospel music became popular in Brazil in the late 1990s, with the emergence of congregational singing and bands such as Diante do Trono, led by Ana Paula Valadão. Diante do Trono has become the largest contemporary worship music ministry in Latin America.

Brazilian rock 

The musical style known in Brazil as "Brazilian rock n' roll" dates back to Nora Ney's "Ronda Das Horas", a Portuguese version of "Rock Around the Clock" in 1954. In the 1960s, young singers like Roberto Carlos and the Jovem Guarda movement were very popular. The 1960s also saw the rise of bands such as the "tropicalistas" Os Mutantes and the experimental (mixing progressive rock, jazz and Música popular brasileira) Som Imaginário.

The 1970s saw the emergence of many progressive rock and/or hard rock bands such as O Terço, A Bolha, A Barca do Sol, Som Nosso de Cada Dia, Vímana and Bacamarte, some of which attained some recognition internationally; Rita Lee, in her solo career after Os Mutantes, championed the glam-rock aesthetics in Brazil; Casa das Máquinas and Patrulha do Espaço were more bona-fide hard rock bands, and the likes of (Raul Seixas, Secos e Molhados, Novos Baianos and A Cor do Som) mixed the genre with traditional Brazilian music. In the late 1970s, the Brazilian punk rock scene kicked off mainly in São Paulo and in Brasília, booming in the 1980s, with Inocentes, Cólera, Ratos de Porão, Garotos Podres, etc.

The real commercial boom of Brazilian rock was in the 1980s, with many bands and artists like Blitz, Gang 90, Barão Vermelho, Legião Urbana, Lobão, Engenheiros do Hawaii, Titãs, Kid Abelha, Paralamas do Sucesso, and many others, and festivals like Rock in Rio and Hollywood Rock. The late 1980s and early 1990s also witnessed the beginnings of an electronica-inspired scene, with a lot more limited commercial potential but achieving some critical acclaim: Suba, Loop B, Harry, etc.

In the 1990s, the meteoric rise of Mamonas Assassinas, which sold more than 3 million copies of its only CD (a record, by Brazilian standards) came to a tragic end when the band's plane crashed, killing all five members of the band, the pilot and the co-pilot. Other commercially successful bands included Jota Quest, Raimundos and Skank, while Chico Science & Nação Zumbi and the whole Mangue Bit movement received much critical attention and accolades, but very little commercial success – success that declined after the death of one of its founders, Chico Science. It was also in the 1990s that the first seeds of what would grow into being the Brazilian indie scene were planted, with the creation of indie festivals such as Abril Pro Rock and, later in the decade, Porão do Rock. The band Pato Fu was considered by Time magazine one of the ten best bands in the world outside the United States. It is also known to re-record hits Brazilian and international versions of toy instruments.

Female singer Pitty is also very popular. The indie scene has been growing exponentially since the early 2000s, with more and more festivals taking place all around the country. However, due to several factors including but not limited to the worldwide collapse of the music industry, all the agitation in the indie scene has so far failed in translating into international success, but in Brazil they developed a real, substantial cultural movement. That scene is still much of a ghetto, with bands capturing the attention of international critics, but many playing again in Brazil when they become popular in the exterior, due to the lack of financial and material support which would allow for careers to be developed. One notable exception is CSS, an alternative electro rock outfit that has launched a successful international career, performing in festivals and venues in North America, Europe, Asia and Australia. Other unique example of success through independent music scene that made to the mainstream is the band Móveis Coloniais de Acaju. The band has its own style, somewhere between rock and folk, and is recognized as the most important independent band in Brazil. The record company Trama  tries to support some bands with structure and exposure, and can be credited with early support to CSS and later to Móveis Coloniais de Acaju.

Brazilian heavy metal 

Brazilian metal originated in the mid 1980s with three prominent scenes: Belo Horizonte, São Paulo and Rio de Janeiro. The most famous Brazilian metal bands are Sepultura, Angra, Krisiun and the singer Andre Matos. Sepultura is considered an influential thrash metal band, influencing the development of death metal.

Famous bands of the 1980s include Korzus, Sarcófago, Overdose, Dorsal Atlântica, Viper, MX, PUS, Mutilator, Chakal, Vulcano and Attomica. Bands from the 1990s include Andralls, MQN, Macaco Bong, Black Drawing Chalks, Superguidis, Mental Hor, The Mist, Scars, Distraught, Torture Squad, Eterna and Silent Cry. Bands from the 2000s include It's All Red, Eyes of Shiva, Autoramas, Tuatha de Danann, Claustrofobia, Quimere, Apokalyptic Raids, Project46, Wizards and Andragonia.

There's also Massacration, a Brazilian satirical heavy metal band, self-proclaimed the "greatest band in the world". They began as a sketch on the MTV show "Hermes & Renato", but were so successful amongst fans, that the comedians decided to turn it into an actual band. Originally parodying Manowar, they eventually became a spoof of Hair Metal bands of the 1980's.

As well as Thrash metal, Brazil is also a reference in Death Metal, the main bands in the scene include Krisiun, Torture Squad, Claustrofobia, Rebaelliun, Visceral Leishmaniasis (Brazil), Obskure, Vulcano, Mental Horror and the precursors Sepultura and Sarcófago. There is a growth in the appearance of Brazilian death metal bands with women in formation, especially Nervosa, who gained a lot of prestige after their performance at Rock in Rio in 2019. The female trio were invited to participate in the Wacken Open Air festival in 2020, but the event was cancelled due to the COVID-19 pandemic. Brazilian Death Metal scene is spread across all regions in the country, especially in the Northeast region where it is represented by bands like Headhunter D.C., Escarnium, Decomposed God, Infested Blood, Heavenless, Torment the Skies, Pandemmy, Burning Torment, Infectos, Krenak and especially Cangaço which is a band that mixes Death metal with elements of Baião (regional rhythm of Northeast Brazil) and on 2010 was the winner of W.O.A Metal Battle Brazil and went to the finals of the Wacken Open Air festival.

Brazilian folk/folk-rock 
The new Brazilian folk scene is not to be mistaken with folkloric Brazilian music. The first to break into the mainstream was internet phenomenon Mallu Magalhães, who played covers of her favourite artists in English and her own songs in both English and Portuguese (as well as other languages).  Magalhães only released her first album in 2008, though by then she was already widely recognised as the voice of this sudden new Brazilian folk scene.  Her ex-boyfriend Hélio Flanders is the lead singer of another Brazilian folk group called Vanguart.  Though Vanguart had an album released before Mallu Magalhães, it was her emergence that consolidated them both and others as a fully recognised mainstream scene, topping charts and being featured in prime time television and advertising.  Other acts emerged after the market was opened up to folk. Writing in English is more and more common among Brazilian rock and folk artists.  This has been highly criticised by Portuguese language purists, though it has helped to promote Brazilian artists in other countries (CSS is a perfect example).  The new Brazilian folk scene has just come to the public's attention and it continues to thrive.

Brazilian psychedelic rock 

Brazil has a long tradition of psychedelic music since artists like Os Mutantes, Ronnie Von and other rock bands from the late 60s. Nowadays, there exists a revival of this psychedelic/vintage inspired music represented by artists like Jupiter Apple, Violeta de Outono, Nação Zumbi, Mundo Livre S/A, Cidadão Instigado, Otto, China, Kassin, Pata de Elefante, Orquestra Abstrata, among others.

Sertanejo 

Música sertaneja or Sertanejo is a term for Brazilian country music. It originally referred to music originating among Sertão and musica caipira. (Caipira music appeared in the state of São Paulo, and some the regions of Mato Grosso do Sul, Goiás, Minas Gerais, Paraná and Mato Grosso. Musical rhythm is very spread out in the Southeastern and southern regions of Brazil.)

The genre is extremely famous in the country, having as some of its greatest exponents Chitãozinho & Xororó, Leandro e Leonardo, Zeze Di Camargo e Luciano, Chrystian & Ralf, João Paulo & Daniel and Sérgio Reis. Additionally, over the past few years, artists such as Jorge & Mateus and Marília Mendonça have been on the rise.

Northeastern Music 

North eastern music is a generic term for any popular music from the large region of Northeastern Brazil, including both coastal and inland areas.  Rhythms are slower and are derived from guitars instead of percussion instruments like in the rest of Brazil—in this region, African rhythms and Portuguese melodies combined to form maracatu and forró.  Most influentially, the area around the state of Pernambuco, the home of frevo and maracatu.

Gaucho music (Southern music) 
Southern music, or Brazilian gaucho music is a general term used for the music originally from the Rio Grande do Sul state, in Southern Brazil. Some of the most famous musicians of this genre are Teixeirinha, Gaúcho da Fronteira, Renato Borghetti, Yamandu Costa, Jayme Caetano Braun and Luiz Marenco, among others.

Music of Salvador: Late 60s to mid-70s 
In the latter part of the 1960s, a group of black Bahians began dressing as Native Americans during the Salvadoran Carnaval, identifying with their shared struggles through history.  These groups included Comanches do Pelô and Apaches de Tororó and were known for a forceful and powerful style of percussion, and frequent violent encounters with the police.  Starting in 1974, a group of black Bahians called Ilê Aiyê became prominent, identifying with the Yoruba people of West Africa.  Along with a policy of loosening restrictions by the Brazilian government, Ilê Aiyê's sound and message spread to groups like Grupo Cultural do Olodum, who established community centers and other philanthropic efforts.

Frevo 

Frevo is a style of music from Olinda and Recife. Frevo bands always play during the Carnival.

Sambass 

Sambass is a fusion of samba and Drum & Bass. The most famous sambass musicians are DJ Marky and DJ Patife whose hit Sambassim might be the most known sambass track.

Funk Carioca 

Funk Carioca is a type of dance music from Rio de Janeiro, derived from and was until the late 1990s, superficially similar to Miami Bass. In Rio it is most often simply known as Funk, although it is very different musically from what Funk means in most other places and contexts.  Funk Carioca, like other types of hip-hop lifts heavily from samples such as international rips or from previous funk music.  Many popular funk songs sampled music from the movie Rocky. Funk was introduced to Brazil in a systematic way in the 1980s. Many funk artists have openly associated themselves with black movements and often in the lyrics of their songs, comment on race relations and openly express black pride. The genre went public with great impact in the 80s, with songs like Feira de Acari by MC Batata, with Furacão 2000, MC Marlboro and Brazilian versions of freestyle songs by the singer Latino, later turning into a more aggressive song, with an apology for violence, drugs, weapons and promiscuity in the 1990s, with precarious lyrics and several MCs with direct links with drug trafficking.

Brazilian pop music 

National pop music was slow to gain popularity in Brazil. Only from 2013, with the song "Show das Poderosas", the singer Anitta became the first name of the genre in Brazil. The singer Ludmilla was also a relevant name in brazilian pop music, the singer emerged from funk carioca and passed a mix of the genres.

Ludmilla's success propelled other funk carioca singers to adopt pop music in their repertoire. Thus a new generation of singers emerged, among them, Valesca Popozuda, Pabllo Vittar, MC Biel and Melody.

The expansion of the pop genre in Brazil prompted singers of other styles to join the movement, such as Luan Santana, Banda Vingadora, Jhama, Gaby Amarantos, Tiago Iorc, among others.

Hip hop music 
In São Paulo and other places in the south of Brazil, in more urban areas, hip hop music is very popular. They dress similarly to American rappers. 

Brazilian hip hop is heavily associated with racial and economic issues in the country, where a lot of Afro-Brazilians live in economically disadvantaged communities, known in Brazil as favelas. São Paulo is where hip hop began in the country, but it soon spread all over Brazil, and today, almost every big Brazilian city, including Rio de Janeiro, Salvador, Curitiba, Porto Alegre, Belo Horizonte, Recife and Brasilia, has a hip hop scene. São Paulo has gained a strong, underground Brazilian rap scene since its emergence in the late 1980s with many independent labels forming for young rappers to establish themselves on.

Brazilian bass 

Brazilian bass is a subgenre of house that originated as a derivation of mainstream deep house music of early 2010s, fused with tech house elements and some minimalistic influences from bass house. The tempo typically range from 120 to 125 bpm. The genre is characterized by distinguishable deep punchy basslines, often making use of low-pitched and filtering effects. The genre was created in Brasília around the mid-2010s, but its national and international repercussion only happened in 2016 with DJs Alok, Bruno Martini and Sevenn.

Notable record labels 
Far Out Recordings
Malandro Records
Mr Bongo Records
Som Livre

See also 

List of Brazilian composers
List of Brazilian singers and bands of Christian music

References

Further reading

External links 
  Audio clips: Traditional music of Brazil. Musée d'Ethnographie de Genève. Accessed 25 November 2010.
BBC Radio 3 Audio (60 minutes): Forro, coco and cowboys. Accessed 25 November 2010.
BBC Radio 3 Audio (60 minutes): Candomble, Samba and Renato Rosa. Accessed 25 November 2010.
BBC Radio 3 Audio (60 minutes): Rio, the samba and Mart'nalia. Accessed 25 November 2010.
BBC Radio 3 Audio (60 minutes): Maracatu, ciranda and Mangue bit. Accessed 25 November 2010.
BBC Radio 3 Audio (60 minutes): Coco music, the pifano flute and Sebastian Dias. Accessed 25 November 2010.
Brazilian Embassy in London – Music Section Brazilian music links
Sounds and Colours Brazil – resource dedicated to Brazilian music and culture Accessed 17 June 2014.
Brazil beyond clichés Vast archive of podcasts covering Brazilian music of all styles, regions and time periods, from vintage sambas to modern blends.
Scores and biographies by classical Brazilian composers available in Musica Brasilis website